Leuconitocris juvenca is a species of beetle in the family Cerambycidae. It was described by Brancsik in 1914. It is known from Tanzania, South Africa, the Democratic Republic of the Congo, Mozambique, Zimbabwe, and Zambia.

Subspecies
 Leuconitocris juvenca capinera (Teocchi, 1989)
 Leuconitocris juvenca juvenca (Brancsik, 1914)

References

Leuconitocris
Beetles described in 1914